KDEL-FM (100.9 FM) is a radio station licensed to serve Arkadelphia, Arkansas, United States. The station is owned by Arkansas Rocks Radio Stations Network.

The station was assigned the KDEL-FM call sign by the Federal Communications Commission on January 31, 1979.

Former logo

References

External links
Fox Sports Radio Arkansas Facebook

DEL-FM
Clark County, Arkansas
Classic rock radio stations in the United States
Radio stations established in 1979
1979 establishments in Arkansas